Our Lady of Ransom and the Holy Souls Church is a Roman Catholic Parish church in Llandrindod Wells. It was founded by the Society of Jesus in 1907. It was rebuilt in 1972. Its original foundation was the only church the Jesuits built in central Wales.

History
The Jesuits came to Llandrindod Wells from St Beuno's College near St Asaph and set up a Mass centre in 1907. Masses were originally held in the old presbytery. The "old presbytery was known as "the upper room" when Fr Barling was its priest.

Later, at some point in the 20th century, the Jesuits handed over the administration of the church to the Diocese of Menevia who continue to serve the parish.

In 1972, a new church was built on Victoria Road, where it still continues to function.

Parish
The church is the centre of the Llandrindod Wells Deanery. It has Sunday Mass at 11:00am.

Gallery

See also
 St Beuno's Ignatian Spirituality Centre

References

External links

 Diocese of Menevia

Our Lady of Ransom and the Holy Souls Church
Churches in Powys
Roman Catholic churches completed in 1972
Roman Catholic churches in Wales
1972 establishments in Wales
20th-century Roman Catholic church buildings in the United Kingdom